Dr. Antonio Da Silva High School (A.D.H.S) and Jr. College of Commerce (A.D.H.S.J.C.C) (Popularly known as A.D.H.S. or nicknamed Antonians) is a semi-private Government, Boys, day school located at Dadar in Mumbai, India. The institution was established in 1851 by Dr Antonio Da Silva and Reverend John Braz Fernandees under the name St. Johna high school. The school caters to pupils from kindergarten up to class 12. The medium of instruction is English. The school houses more than 6,000 pupils aged 3 to 18.

The school is affiliated to the Maharashtra State Board of Secondary and Higher Secondary Education, Pune, which conducts the SSC examinations at the close of class 10 and the HSC examinations at the close of class 12.

Alumni are commonly known as Antonians Alumnus. They include India politicians, government officials and business leaders.  The Sister school of A.D.H.S Dr. Antonio da Silva Technical High School and Junior College of Science located at the Shivaji Park was established in June 1963.

History

As a 164-year-old institution, it has a long history of traditions and education excellence, as well as a long list of alumni and activities.

The Institution was founded in 1851 at Dadar in Bombay, British India by Dr. Antonio Da Silva and John Braz Fernandees under the name St. Johna high school. In 1875, Da Silva left the bulk of his estate for the extension of the high school, when the school came to its present name.

The school started a technical Stream from Standard VII in June 1963. It became a full-fledged independent Technical High School on 13 June 1971. The Junior College of both the Commerce and Technical schools, started in 1975, offering Science (Biology) and Vocational streams. Vocational streams offer three options: Electrical Maintenance, Scooter Servicing and Mechanical Maintenance.

During that time the Institution was recognised and aided by the Directors of Vocational Education and Training (Maharashtra State). The institution prepares pupils for the Secondary School Certificate Examination (with technical subjects) and Higher Secondary Certificate (with science/vocational science subjects) of the Maharashtra State Board.

Campus site and layout 

Buildings include the Office Heritage Block, Heritage Block, Center Block, South Block, Antonians hall and sports complex and grounds.

Facilities 

The school has a large library with over 20,000 books and digital books that are accessible to the students during school hours. Separate science laboratories for Physics, Chemistry and Biology are available. The science laboratories are used by 6–12 class students to carry out practical work. The school has three computer laboratories where students from kindergarten through class 12 study computing. The school has a mini-theatre for educational and entertainment purposes and also has a television room. The school has two drawing rooms that are used for drawing and arts. Four Gardens including two play parks, one botanical garden and one tracking garden are on the grounds.

The school has three halls: Antonians hall Old Little Hall and the Alumnus Hall. A cafeteria is run by the Interact club for use by both faculty and students. The school has various indoor and outdoor sports facilities.

Affiliation and ethos 

The School and College is Roman Catholic and the Society of Jesus exercises responsibility through a Governing Body whose chairman is the Provincial of the Bombay Province of the Society. The school was founded as St. Johna high school is named after St. Johna.

School flag and crest 

The flag of the school represents the Crest, which consists of an eagle on top, which represents courage and honour and on its bottom is a book written with the word Scientiae in Latin which means Science. On the top of the book a lamp represent Light of Knowledge and on the left lilies which represents Purity and on the right an ivy plant that represents sincerity and faithfulness. On the bottom of the shield is the school motto of the school, bordered by olive leaves.

Motto, school song and school hymn 

The school's motto is Scientiae Luce Caritate Duce (Latin for The light of science the charity of the duke). The School anthem is God bless the Antonians, which was adopted in 1851 when the school was established. The school song is generally sung during the morning assembly and on special occasions.

Invocation

Academics

Admissions 

The admission notice for kindergarten and junior kindergarten is put up in January. For senior kindergarten to class 8 and for class 11 of Jr. College of Commerce the notice is put up in April. During the admission procedure, preference is given to siblings of former students, Protestant Christians and relatives of teachers. An interview of each candidate is conducted as a part of the admission process.

Curriculum 

The school follows the Maharashtra State Board of Secondary and Higher Secondary Education (SSC) & (HSC) syllabus. Marathi, Hindi and French are taught as second languages. English, Marathi and Hindi are taught from class 1 to class 12.

The style of teaching ranges from informal for preschool and a progressively more formal type for older students. No formal homework is assigned in the lower primary levels and limited homework is assigned in the higher levels.

The academic year commences in June and concludes in April, consisting of two terms. The first term is from June until November and the second term is from November to April. Tests are conducted periodically and examinations are held at the end of every term.

Field trips, camps and social service visits are organised regularly.

Examinations 

At the end of class 10, students appear for the SSC and HSC Examinations. The school's students have consistently performed well both at the SSC and HSC examinations and the school has maintained a 100% pass-rate.

Examination candidates need to finish satisfactorily courses in an Art and Craft, Physical Education, Moral Education and Socially Useful Productive Work (SUPW). These are evaluated internally by the school and the results contribute towards the award of the SSC and HSC pass certificate. Project work is assessed from class 1 to class 12.

Academic life

Pupils 

Pupils are known as "Antonians". The Antonians and press often call alumni Antonians Almuns, or simply Old Boys. The vast majority of alumni are Indians, but a dwindling number of Englishmen from before the 1948 Batches studied there.

House system 

The objective of the house system is to foster a sense of collective responsibility and solidarity among students. The house system serves as the centre of school life, with students from different houses often competing at sports and other activities. The four school houses are Red, Green, Yellow and Blue. Each house has 1,500 students. The houses also bear the names of planets. Every house is headed by a house captain and a house vice-captain who are elected from Class 8 and Class 9 respectively. A games captain and a games vice-captain are also selected to manage the sports activities of the house.

School uniform 

Boys from class 1 through class 6 wear olive green shorts, while boys of class 7 and 10 wear trousers. The rest of the uniform consists of a half-sleeved white shirt, a olive green tie with house badge, olive green belt with white strips, white socks and black leather laced shoes. The school Marshall, house captain and house vice-captain wear a three, two and one star badge designed to distinguish them from other house members. For sports, physical training activities, fields trip, etc. students wear specially made T-shirts representing the colours of their houses.

Culture 

The school is a cosmopolitan school. The Christmas concert is a three-day event. A sports meet and a farewell party for new graduates are also held annually. Inter-house competitions are held in elocution, drama, song, etc.

Student Council 

The student council holds periodic meetings to discuss relevant topics. The Student Council is headed by a School Marshall who is elected annually from Class 10, and a School Vice-Marshall who is elected annually from Class 9. They abandon their respective houses when they take office.

Other officers 
A team of prefects is selected from each house. Other offices include class and division monitor and vice-monitor, cupboard monitor and the Treasury Monitor of the respective class and divisions. They are the important link between the students of the school and the management of the school.

School activities 

Extracurricular activities include student-led clubs on campus, including the Nature Club, Interact Club, Science Club, Scouts and Guides, and Scottish Junior Rifle Club. Inter-house debates, elocution, PowerPoint presentation competitions, essay writing competitions, dramatics and sporting competitions engage older students. Sports activities at the high school include football, cricket, basketball, swimming, throwball and roller skating.

Sports 

Sports are compulsory. Cricket, hockey, athletics, boxing and association football are played seasonally. Tennis, table tennis, badminton, squash and gymnastics tournaments are held. Sport is dominated by football, cricket, basketball, hockey, volleyball and handball during the spring term and by football, athletics and boxing in the autumn term. Inter-house matches are played in cricket, hockey and football.

Sports facilities include a multi-purpose hall with a gymnasium and other indoor sports. Artificial turf cricket pitches, outdoor basketball courts, four badminton courts, two Tennis courts, four squash courts, and a ground that can be converted into a 400-metre athletics tracks. The school has a large sports field at the rear, and a separate playground for the students of junior school.

The school has a long tradition of winning major matches and tournaments in football, cricket, volleyball, handball, badminton and several other sports.  The school lost the final to NSS Hill Spring Boys Under 17 Subroto Cup Football Tournaments in 2011 it has lost the Final match of the Tournaments by 0–10.

Clubs and societies 

Extracurricular activities are also a compulsory element of school life. Some 27 clubs and societies exist, covering politics, drama, photography, aeromodeling, first-aid, dramatics, painting, sculpture, carpentry, amateur radio, music, senior and junior English debating societies, Model United Nations, chess and astronomy. In many societies pupils come together to discuss a particular topic or subject, presided over by a schoolmaster and often including a guest speaker.

Prominent figures give speeches and talks to the students; these have included heads of state, politicians, ornithologists, naturalists, artists, writers, economists, diplomats and industrialists.

Theatre and music 

A multi-purpose theatre space known as The Antonians hall was built in 1965 seating over 1,200. It was inaugurated in April 1965 as a venue with modular seating and staging units. The facility is equipped with state-of-the-art stagecraft and engineering systems and has been the setting for numerous Shakespeare and other classic productions of western theatre, as well as musical performances and speeches during school ceremonies such as Founder's Day. The multi-purpose Old Little Hall venue is the old theatre that was built in 1851. It can accommodate approximately 400 people. Plays are regularly staged in English, Marathi and Hindi, with 11–12 productions each year, including 2 major productions as part of Founder's Day celebrations. The Inter House Once-Act Play competition is held each year, alternatively in English and Hindi. Many of the plays historically have been joint productions with its sister school.

The Alumnus Hall seats over 200 is the more modern multi-purpose theatre built in 1990 as a black box theatre with modular seating and staging units and is normally used to explore new directions in performance art. In 1999 a new music facility was built, housing a music library, a concert hall and several practice and teaching rooms where students learn western and Indian instruments.

The school has a band that won a prize at zonal level.

School newspaper and magazines 

The Antonians Weekly is the official school newspaper, distributed every weekend. It chronicles school activities and is a platform for creative and political writing. It was founded in 1901 and is edited by pupils and staff. Other school magazines include The Antonians Annual and The Antonians Alumnus (a monthly Alumni magazine). Publications by academic departments include Curiosity (Science), The Oikonomia (Economics), The Question (Mathematics), Truth vs Hype (Political Science) and The Enigma (History and Geography).

Road Safety Patrol
The Road Safety Patrol won first prize at the all Mumbai rally, and became the part of the Republic Day (RD) parade.

Affiliations 

The school's sister school is Dr. Antonio da Silva Technical High School and Junior College of Science, located at the Shivaji Park area of Mumbai. The school also has ties with Our lady of Convent Girls High School, Our Lady of Salvation High School and many other schools.

Sister school 

The school started a technical stream from Standard VII in June 1963. It became a full-fledged independent Technical High School on 13 June 1971 and is at present housed at S. Veer Savarkar Road (also known as Cadell road) in Shivaji Park. In 1970 the Institution was registered as Dr Antonio da Silva Technical High School feeder school. The Junior College of Commerce at Dr Antonio da Silva High School and Jr. College of Science at Dr Antonio da Silva Technical High School, started in 1975, offers Science (Biology) and Vocational streams. Vocational streams offer three options: Electrical Maintenance, Scooter Servicing and Mechanical Maintenance. That same year the name of the Technical Institution was renamed as Dr Antonio da Silva Technical High School and Jr. College of Science.

Memberships 

The Dr. Antonio da Silva High School and Junior College of Commerce is a member of the Rotary International's Interact Club, International Boys' Schools Coalition (IBSC), Rashtriya Life Saving Society (India).

Administration

Results
Dr. Antonio Da Silva High School have always tried to score good marks.

 In 2020 SSC Examination the school scored 100%.

Social initiatives

Controversy 

On 14 March 2013, the police and trustees of the Dr Antonio Da Silva High School were investigating allegations that a six-year-old Class I student was handcuffed with a cycle-lock chain, paraded before students of various classrooms and made to clean a toilet room. The father of the boy lodged a complaint with Shivaji Park police station against a teacher and the headmistress. The teacher allegedly handcuffed and paraded the boy, while the headmistress took no action following the parent's complaint. That month the matter was pending at the Maharashtra State Commission for Protection of Child Rights (MSCPCR).

Incidents 

Thirty-five years after leaving school in Std VII, gangster Ashwin Naik (49) went back to the school on 9 November 2009 to collect his leaving certificate.

On 13 July 2011 at 18:30 IST (UTC+05:30), a bomb exploded outside the school. It was the third explosive device of the 2011 Mumbai bombings. The device was placed on an electric pole at the bus stand near Kabutar Khana. At least 50 people were injured in the blast. No one from the school was injured. If the bomb had exploded five minutes earlier, thousands of students may have been injured. The school remained closed the next day.

See also

Maharashtra State Board of Secondary and Higher Secondary Education
Education in India
List of schools in Mumbai
List of schools in Mumbai
List of the oldest schools in the world
Dadar
2011 Mumbai bombings

References

Private schools in Mumbai
High schools and secondary schools in Mumbai
Boys' schools in India
Schools in Colonial India
Junior colleges in Maharashtra
Universities and colleges in Mumbai
Educational institutions established in 1851
1851 establishments in India